Lukas Peter Rupp (born 8 January 1991) is a German professional footballer who plays as a midfielder for Super League Greece club Aris.

Rupp has spent most of his career playing in Germany, playing for teams such as Karlsruher SC, Borussia Mönchengladbach, SC Paderborn 07, VfB Stuttgart, and 1899 Hoffenheim. He has also played in England with Norwich City, and in Greece with Aris.

Career

Early career
Rupp's father Franz Rupp was a professional Handball player in Leutershausen. Rupp's professional career as a footballer began with Karlsruher SC. In June 2011, alongside teammate Matthias Zimmermann, Rupp was signed by Borussia Mönchengladbach. Upon his signing, sporting director Max Eberl praised his versatility. Despite managing an assist in a DFB-Pokal match against SSV Jahn Regensburg, 21 year old Rupp was unable to secure first team football in his debut season at the Borussia-Park, playing just three times, before being loaned to SC Paderborn.

SC Paderborn
At the end of the 2013–14 season, Rupp was informed that his Borussia Mönchengladbach contract was not to be renewed. Rupp then joined SC Paderborn 07, for whom he had previously played for on loan. He signed a two-year deal with Paderborn, who had just been promoted for the first time in their history under coach André Breitenreiter. Rupp's new side began the season well, topping the table after four rounds, and Rupp was personally successful in taking a first team spot. Rupp came off the bench to score twice in a crucial relegation battle against SC Freiburg, as Paderborn came back to win 2–1, their third away win of the campaign. However, at the end of the season, the team was relegated alongside Freiburg, having finished in last place.

VfB Stuttgart
After Paderborn's relegation, Rupp moved to VfB Stuttgart, who had been Bundesliga champions less than a decade ago. Costing Stuttgart nothing in transfer fees, Rupp signed a three-year contract. On the same day, Stuttgart also signed PSV Eindhoven goalkeeper Przemysław Tytoń. Rupp missed some games having suffered from flu, but still made 29 appearances over the course of the season. By the end of the year, Stuttgart were relegated, following a last day 3–1 defeat to VfL Wolfsburg. Rupp's performances were described as the 'bright light in a season to forget' and he was linked with Middlesbrough, newly promoted to the Premier League. Rupp was Stuttgart's player of the season, with his consistency that brought 5 goals and 6 assists.

1899 Hoffenheim
Rupp's Stuttgart contract was due to run until 2018, but after relegation, his future became uncertain, and he openly admitted that he was looking to leave to ensure top flight football for the upcoming season. On 28 June, it was reported that Rupp was in talks with 1899 Hoffenheim and that a transfer was 'imminent'. The reported cost was up to €6 million. The next day his transfer was confirmed, and Rupp returned to the area of his birth, with Hoffenheim very nearby to his hometown Heidelberg.

Norwich City

In January 2020 he signed for English club Norwich City. He scored his first goal for the club on 24 August 2021, in a 6–0 victory over Bournemouth in the second round of the EFL Cup.

Aris
In January 2023 he signed for Greek club Aris.

Personal life
Rupp split from his girlfriend Noelle Mondoloni in 2014.

Career statistics

References

External links

 

1991 births
Living people
Sportspeople from Heidelberg
Footballers from Baden-Württemberg
German footballers
Germany youth international footballers
Association football midfielders
Karlsruher SC II players
Karlsruher SC players
Borussia Mönchengladbach players
Borussia Mönchengladbach II players
SC Paderborn 07 players
VfB Stuttgart players
TSG 1899 Hoffenheim players
Norwich City F.C. players
Bundesliga players
2. Bundesliga players
Premier League players
English Football League players
German expatriate footballers
German expatriate sportspeople in England
Expatriate footballers in England
German expatriate sportspeople in Greece
Expatriate footballers in Greece
Aris Thessaloniki F.C. players